Banner Township, Illinois refers to one of the following places:

 Banner Township, Effingham County, Illinois
 Banner Township, Fulton County, Illinois

See also

Banner Township (disambiguation)

Illinois township disambiguation pages